The Pampas are fertile South American lowlands.

Pampas may also refer to:

Animals and plants
 Pampas cat, a small wild cat
 Pampas deer, a deer
 Pampas fox, a medium-sized zorro
 Pampas meadowlark, a bird
 Cortaderia selloana, pampas grass, a flowering plant
 Salpichroa origanifolia, pampas lily-of-the-valley, a flowering plant

Places

 Pampas, Peru
 Pampas District, Huaraz, Peru
 Pampas District, Pallasca, Peru
 Pampas District, Tayacaja, Peru
 Ostrobothnia, a region of Finland locally known as Pampas
 Pampas, Queensland, a locality in the Toowoomba Region, Australia
 Cortland Township, DeKalb County, Illinois, U.S., formerly Pampas Township

Other uses
 Pampas XV, an Argentine rugby union team.
 Aurinel Pampas, a character in Nemesis by Isaac Asimov

See also

 Pampa (disambiguation)